Aida Jekshenbayevna Ismailova (born 17 December 1976) is a Kyrgyz politician. She served as the First Deputy Prime Minister of Kyrgyzstan from 1 April 2020 to 3 February 2021 and has served as a member of the Supreme Council since 2015. She was awarded with the honorary diploma of the Kyrgyz Republic "Ardak", the honorary medal of distinction "Datka Ayim" of the Kyrgyz Association of Women Police Officers.

References

External links
 Government of Kyrgyzstan official site
 Parliament of Kyrgyzstan official site

1976 births
Living people
People from Bishkek
Women government ministers of Kyrgyzstan
21st-century Kyrgyzstani women politicians
21st-century Kyrgyzstani politicians